is an overall designation for gamefowl in Japan. There are seven recognised breeds of Shamo chicken in Japan, all of which are designated Natural Monuments of Japan. The Shamo breeds are thought to derive from fighting chickens of Malay type brought from Thailand in the early part of the 17th century.

History 
The name Shamo is a corruption of the word Siam, the historical name for Thailand, and first entered Japanese during the early Edo period (1603–1867). Even though the breed was originally from Thailand, it has been selectively bred for several hundred years and is very different from the original stock. The breed is used in naked-heeled cockfighting in Japan, where it is still legal. It is also bred all over the world for its show quality and unique upright posture.

O-Shamo and Chu-Shamo are designations for different weight categories of large fowl, whereas the Nankin-Shamo is a bantam chicken. The , unlike O-Shamo and Chu-Shamo, is merely an ornamental breed not used for cockfighting, although it is bred to be temperamental and show the spirit of a fighter. While it is not related to the other breeds, it is often assumed to be because of the similarity of their names.

Breeds 

The seven recognised Shamo breeds designated as Natural Monuments of Japan are:

 Ehigo-Nankin-Shamo
 O-Shamo ("large Shamo")
 Kinpa
 Ko-Shamo ("small Shamo")
 Nankin-Shamo (Nankin Shamo)
 Yakido or Ygido
 Yamato-Shamo or Yamato Gunkei

Other Shamo variants are the Chu-Shamo ("medium Shamo") and the Chibi Shamo.

In the West 

In the United Kingdom, the Shamo, Ko-Shamo, Nankin Shamo, Yakido and Yamato Gunkei are recognised as distinct breeds, while Chu-Shamo and Chibi Shamo receive a passing mention in the British Poultry Standards. The Entente Européenne recognises the Shamo, Ko-Shamo, Yakido and Yamato Gunkei, and lists the Chu-Shamo and Nankin Shamo as unrecognised. The Australian Poultry Standards have only one form of Shamo, which has a minimum weight of 3 kg. The American Poultry Association recognises the Shamo as a breed, both full-sized and bantam.

References

Chicken breeds
Chicken breeds originating in Thailand
Chicken breeds originating in Japan